Przebędowo may refer to:
Przebędowo, Greater Poland Voivodeship (west-central Poland)
Przebędowo, Pomeranian Voivodeship (north Poland)
Przebędowo, Warmian-Masurian Voivodeship (north Poland)
Przebędowo (PKP station)
Przebędowo Lęborskie (PKP station)